Ressu Comprehensive School is a Helsinki city school in Kamppi, Helsinki, Finland. There are currently 9 grades in the school, grades 1-6 following the PYP, 7-9 the MYP. The languages of instruction are Finnish and English, students enroll either in the Finnish or the English language of acquisition stream. The school's objective is to provide   basic education for all Helsinki residents.

Currently, Ressu has approximately 650 students and 50 teachers.

Curriculum
The school's curriculum is based on the Finnish national core curriculum and the frameworks provided by the International Baccalaureate Organization programmes (both IB Middle Years Programme) (MYP) and IB Primary Years Programme) (PYP)

In Finland, the comprehensive schools provide basic education for grades 1 to 9. Their objective is to provide each pupil with the opportunity for diverse learning, growth and for development of healthy self-esteem. All comprehensive schools aim to provide good basic skills and knowledge and sufficient all-round learning. Ressu Comprehensive is a city school and is managed by the City of Helsinki.

|image_caption = Clockwise from top: City of London in the foreground with Canary Wharf in the far background, Trafalgar Square, London Eye, Tower Bridge and a London Underground roundel in front of Elizabeth Tower

History 
The school was originally established in 1891. The current school building was built in 1939, and renovated in 1994–1996, 2006 and 2011–2012.

During World War I, the school building served as a military hospital.

Notable people
Ana Diamond, human rights activist

References
 
 

 Helsinki Department of Education

Schools in Helsinki
International schools in Finland
International Baccalaureate schools in Finland
Educational institutions established in 1891
School buildings completed in 1939
1891 establishments in the Russian Empire